Adalbert of Prague (95623 April 997), known in the Czech Republic, Poland and Slovakia by his birth name Vojtěch, was a White Croatian missionary and Christian saint. He was the Bishop of Prague and a missionary to the Hungarians, Poles, and Prussians, who was martyred in his efforts to convert the Baltic Prussians to Christianity. He is said to be the composer of the oldest Czech hymn Hospodine, pomiluj ny and Bogurodzica, the oldest known Polish hymn, but his authorship of them has not been confirmed.

Adalbert was later declared the patron saint of the Czech Republic, Poland, and the Duchy of Prussia. He is also the patron saint of the Archdiocese of Esztergom in Hungary.

Life

Early years
Born as Vojtěch in 952 or ca. 956 in gord Libice, he belonged to the Slavnik clan (of White Croatian origin), one of the two most powerful families in Bohemia. Events from his life were later recorded by a Bohemian priest Cosmas of Prague (1045–1125). Vojtěch's father was Slavník (d. 978–981), a duke ruling a province centred at Libice. His mother was Střezislava (d. 985–987), and according to David Kalhous belonged to the Přemyslid dynasty. He had five brothers: Soběslav, Spytimír, Dobroslav, Pořej, and Čáslav. Cosmas also refers to Radim (later Gaudentius) as a brother; who is believed to have been a half-brother by his father's liaison with another woman. After he survived a grave illness in childhood, his parents decided to dedicate him to the service of God. Adalbert was well educated, having studied for approximately ten years (970-80) in Magdeburg under Adalbert of Magdeburg. The young Vojtěch took his tutor's name "Adalbert" at his Confirmation.

Episcopacy

 
In 981 Adalbert of Magdeburg died, and his young protege Adalbert returned to Bohemia. Later Bishop Dietmar of Prague ordained him a Catholic priest. In 982, Bishop Dietmar died, and Adalbert, despite being under canonical age, was chosen to succeed him as Bishop of Prague. Amiable and somewhat worldly, he was not expected to trouble the secular powers by making excessive claims for the Church. Although Adalbert was from a wealthy family, he avoided comfort and luxury, and was noted for his charity and austerity. After six years of preaching and prayer, he had made little headway in evangelizing the Bohemians, who maintained deeply embedded pagan beliefs.

Adalbert opposed the participation of Christians in the slave trade and complained of polygamy and idolatry, which were common among the people. Once he started to propose reforms he was met with opposition from both the secular powers and the clergy. His family refused to support Duke Boleslaus in an unsuccessful war against Poland. Adalbert was no longer welcome and eventually forced into exile. In 988 he went to Rome. He lived as a hermit at the Benedictine monastery of Saint Alexis. Five years later, Boleslaus requested that the Pope send Adalbert back to Prague, in hopes of securing his family's support. Pope John XV agreed, with the understanding that Adalbert was free to leave Prague if he continued to encounter entrenched resistance. Adalbert returned as bishop of Prague, where he was initially received with demonstrations of apparent joy. Together with a group of Italian Benedictine monks which brought with him, he founded in 14 January 993 a monastery in Břevnov (then situated westward from Prague, now part of the city), the second oldest monastery on Czech territory.

In 995, the Slavniks' former rivalry with the Přemyslids, who were allied with the powerful Bohemian clan of the Vršovids, resulted in the storming of the Slavnik town of Libice nad Cidlinou, which was led by the Přemyslid Boleslaus II the Pious. During the struggle four or five of Adalbert's brothers were killed. The Zlič Principality became part of the Přemyslids' estate. Adalbert unsuccessfully attempted to protect a noblewoman caught in adultery. She had fled to a convent, where she was killed. In upholding the right of sanctuary, Bishop Adalbert responded by excommunicating the murderers. Butler suggests that the incident was orchestrated by enemies of his family.

After this, Adalbert could not safely stay in Bohemia and escaped from Prague. Strachkvas was eventually appointed to be his successor. However, Strachkvas suddenly died during the liturgy at which he was to accede to his episcopal office in Prague. The cause of his death is still ambiguous. The Pope directed Adalbert to resume his see, but believing that he would not be allowed back, Adalbert requested a brief as an itinerant missionary.

Adalbert then traveled to Hungary and probably baptized Géza of Hungary and his son Stephen in Esztergom. Then he went to Poland where he was cordially welcomed by then-Duke Boleslaus I and installed as Bishop of Gniezno.

Mission and martyrdom in Prussia

Adalbert again relinquished his diocese, namely that of Gniezno, and set out as a missionary to preach to the inhabitants near Prussia. Bolesław I, Duke (and, later, King) of Poland, sent soldiers with Adalbert on his mission to the Prussians. The Bishop and his companions, entered Prussian territory and traveled along the coast of the Baltic Sea to Gdańsk. At the borders of the Polish realm, at the mouth of the Vistula River, his half-brother Radim (Gaudentius), Benedict-Bogusza (who was probably a Pole), and at least one interpreter, ventured out into Prussia alone, as Bolesław had only sent his soldiers to escort them to the border.

Adalbert achieved some success upon his arrival, however his arrival mostly caused strain upon the local Prussian populations. Partially this was because of the imperious manner with which he preached, but potentially because he preached utilizing a book. The Prussians had an oral society where communication was face to face. To the locals Adalbert reading from a book may have come off as a manifestation of an evil action. He was forced to leave this first village after being struck in the back of the head by an oar by a local chieftain, causing the pages of his book to scatter upon the ground. He and his companions then fled across a river.

In the next place that Adalbert tried to preach, his message was met with the locals banging their sticks upon the ground, calling for the death of Adalbert and his companions. Retreating once again Adalbert and his companions went to a market place of Truso (near modern-day Elbląg). Here they were met with a similar response as at the previous place. On the 23 April 997, after mass, while Adalbert and his companions lay in the grass while eating a snack, they were set upon by a pagan mob. The mob was led by a man named Sicco, possibly a pagan priest, who delivered the first blow against Adalbert, before the others joined in. They removed Adalbert's head from his body after he was dead, and mounted on a pole while they returned home. This encounter may also have taken place in Tenkitten and Fischhausen (now Primorsk, Kaliningrad Oblast, Russia). It is recorded that his body was bought back for its weight in gold by King Boleslaus I of Poland.

Veneration and relics

A few years after his martyrdom, Adalbert was canonized as Saint Adalbert of Prague. His life was written in Vita Sancti Adalberti Pragensis by various authors, the earliest being traced to imperial Aachen and the Bishop of Liège, Notger von Lüttich, although it was previously assumed that the Roman monk John Canaparius wrote the first Vita in 999. Another famous biographer of Adalbert was Bruno of Querfurt who wrote a hagiography of him in 1001–4.

Notably, the Přemyslid rulers of Bohemia initially refused to ransom Adalbert's body from the Prussians who murdered him, and therefore it was purchased by Poles. This fact may be explained by Adalbert's belonging to the Slavniks family which was rival to the Přemyslids. Thus Adalbert's bones were preserved in Gniezno, which assisted Boleslaus I of Poland in increasing Polish political and diplomatic power in Europe.

According to Bohemian accounts, in 1039 the Bohemian Duke Bretislav I looted the bones of Adalbert from Gniezno in a raid and translated them to Prague. According to Polish accounts, however, he stole the wrong relics, namely those of Gaudentius, while the Poles concealed Adalbert's relics which remain in Gniezno. In 1127 his severed head, which was not in the original purchase according to Roczniki Polskie, was discovered and translated to Gniezno. In 1928, one of the arms of Adalbert, which Bolesław I had given to Holy Roman Emperor Otto III in 1000, was added to the bones preserved in Gniezno. Therefore, today Adalbert has two elaborate shrines in the Prague Cathedral and Royal Cathedral of Gniezno, each of which claims to possess his relics, but which of these bones are his authentic relics is unknown. For example, pursuant to both claims two skulls are attributed to Adalbert. The one in Gniezno was stolen in 1923.

The massive bronze doors of Gniezno Cathedral, dating from around 1175, are decorated with eighteen reliefs of scenes from Adalbert's life. They are the only Romanesque ecclesiastical doors in Europe depicting a cycle illustrating the life of a saint, and therefore are a precious relic documenting Adalbert's martyrdom. We can read that door literally and theologically.

The one thousandth anniversary of Adalbert's martyrdom was on 23 April 1997. It was commemorated in Poland, the Czech Republic, Germany, Russia, and other nations. Representatives of Catholic, Eastern Orthodox, and Evangelical churches traveled on a pilgrimage to Adalbert's tomb located in Gniezno. Pope John Paul II visited the cathedral and celebrated a liturgy there in which heads of seven European nations and approximately one million faithful participated.

A ten-meter cross was erected near the village of Beregovoe (formerly Tenkitten), Kaliningrad Oblast, where Adalbert is thought to have been martyred by the Prussians.

Feast day 
 25 January – commemoration of translation of relics to Church of Saint Roch,
 22 April – commemoration in Diocese of Innsbruck,
 23 April – commemoration of death anniversary,
 22 April – commemoration in Catholic Church in England and Wales,
 14 May – commemoration of consecration of church in Aachen
 25 August – commemoration of translation of relics from Gniezno to Prague (1039)
 26 August – commemoration of translation of relics to Wrocław
 20 October – commemoration of translation of relics to Gniezno (1090)
 22 October – commemoration of translation of relics to Gniezno
 6 November  –  commemoration of translation of relics to Esztergom,
He is also commemorated on 23 April by Evangelical Church in Germany and Eastern Orthodox Church.

In popular culture and society 
The Dagmar and Václav Havel VIZE 97 Foundation Prize, given annually to a distinguished thinker "whose work exceeds the traditional framework of scientific knowledge, contributes to the understanding of science as an integral part of general culture and is concerned with unconventional ways of asking fundamental questions about cognition, being and human existence"
includes a massive replica of Adalbert's crozier by Czech artist Jiří Plieštík.

St. Vojtech Fellowship was established in 1870 by Slovak Catholic priest Andrej Radlinský. It had facilitated Slovak Catholic thinkers and authors, continuing to publish religious original works and translations to this day. It is the official publishing body of Episcopal Conference of Slovakia.

Churches and parishes named for Adalbert

See also
 History of the Czech lands in the Middle Ages
 History of Poland (966–1385)
 Congress of Gniezno
 Gniezno Doors
 Adalbert of Magdeburg
 Saint Adalbert of Prague, patron saint archive
 Statue of Adalbert of Prague, Charles Bridge

References

Sources

Donald Attwater and Catherine R. John, The Penguin Dictionary of Saints, Third Edition (New York: Penguin Books, 1993); .

External links
 
  

Adalbert of Prague
Adalbert of Prague
10th-century bishops in Bohemia
Roman Catholic bishops of Prague
Medieval Bohemian nobility
Slavník dynasty
People from Nymburk District
Czech Christian missionaries
Burials at St. Vitus Cathedral
Burials at Gniezno Cathedral
Czech Roman Catholic saints
Polish Roman Catholic saints
10th-century Christian saints
10th-century Christian martyrs
10th century in Hungary
10th century in Poland
Christian missionaries in Europe
Patron saints of Poland
Eastern Orthodox saints